Kamuli General Hospital, also Kamuli District Hospital or Kamuli Government Hospital is a hospital in Kamuli, in Kamuli District, in the Eastern Region of Uganda. It is a public hospital, owned by the Ugandan Government and is administered by the Uganda Ministry of Health.

Location
The coordinates of Kamuli General Hospital are: 0°56'50.0"N, 33°07'16.0"E (Latitude:0.947223; Longitude:33.121106).

Overview
Kamuli Hospital is a public hospital owned by the Uganda Government and administered by the Uganda Ministry of Health. Kamuli Hospital has a planned bed capacity of 100. However, many more patients are admitted with some sharing beds of sleeping on the floor. The hospital offers services in an environment of great challenges, including corruption, inadequate staffing, poor remuneration, insufficient medication and antiquated medical equipment.

See also
List of hospitals in Uganda

References

External links
Website of Uganda Ministry of Health

Hospitals in Uganda
Kamuli District
Busoga
Eastern Region, Uganda